Żabokrzeki  is a village in the administrative district of Gmina Piątek, within Łęczyca County, Łódź Voivodeship, in central Poland.

History 
In the years 1975–1998 the town was part of the administration of the Płock Province. Since 1999 it has been part of the New Łódź Voivodeship.

Demography 
Demographic structure as of March 31, 2011:

References

Villages in Łęczyca County